Leonardo Salutati (died 1466) was a Roman Catholic prelate who served as Bishop of Fiesole (1450–1466).

Biography
On 3 August 1450, Leonardo Salutati was appointed during the papacy of Pope Nicholas V as Bishop of Fiesole. 
He served as Bishop of Fiesole until his death in 1466.

References 

15th-century Italian Roman Catholic bishops
Bishops appointed by Pope Nicholas V
1466 deaths